Raymond Williams (born 9 September 1959 in Holyhead, North Wales) is a Welsh weightlifter.

Williams was voted Young Welsh Sports Personality of the Year in 1977 after being placed in the junior weightlifting championships. He joined the army and served with the Royal Welch Fusiliers until 2003.

Returning to the sport, Williams won the Welsh weightlifting championships in 1983 and the Celtic Nations title the following year.

Williams won the gold medal in the featherweight class at the 1986 Commonwealth Games in Edinburgh, beating David Lowenstein of Australia and Jeffrey Brice, a fellow Welshman.

In 2003, Williams was appointed as the first National Weightlifting Coach for Wales.

External links
 Ray Williams on the BBC Wales sports hall of fame

1959 births
Living people
Welsh male weightlifters
British male weightlifters
Weightlifters at the 1986 Commonwealth Games
Commonwealth Games gold medallists for Wales
Royal Welch Fusiliers soldiers
People from Holyhead
Commonwealth Games medallists in weightlifting
Sportspeople from Anglesey
Medallists at the 1986 Commonwealth Games